Judith Raskin (June 21, 1928 – December 21, 1984) was an American lyric soprano, renowned for her fine voice as well as her acting.

Life and work
Raskin was born in New York to Harry A. Raskin, a high school music teacher, and Lillian Raskin, a grade school teacher.  Her father aroused her childhood interest in music, leading her to study violin and piano, before she turned her focus to singing.  In 1945, she graduated from Roosevelt High School, Yonkers and attended Smith College, where she majored in music.  It was during her college years that she began taking singing lessons, which she continued after graduation in order to develop further the warmth and artistry of her voice.

In 1948, she married Dr. Raymond A. Raskin, with whom she had two children, Jonathan and Lisa.

Winning the Marian Anderson award in 1952 and 1953, and the Musicians Club of New York's Young Artist Award in 1956, Raskin started to perform in concerts throughout the United States.  She secured national recognition in 1957 for her part as Sister Constance in the televised American premiere of Poulenc's Dialogues des Carmélites.  Her prominence continued to rise in July the same year when she starred in a concert version of Puccini's La bohème, with the Symphony of the Air in Central Park.  Finally, in 1959, she joined the New York City Opera (NYCO), debuting as Despina in Mozart's Così fan tutte.

Her next spectacular performance was the title role of Douglas Moore's The Ballad of Baby Doe for the New York City Opera in 1960. She also sang Baby Doe in Central City Colorado where the opera had premiered. Two years later, she made her crowning debut in 1962 at the Metropolitan Opera, as Susanna in Mozart's The Marriage of Figaro.  It is with Mozart that she became most closely associated. Reviewing the debut Raymond Ericsson wrote “ Pretty as a picture, never forcing her musical phrases or overplaying the comedy, enunciating the Italian like a veteran, Miss Raskin was as appealing a Susanna as the Met could wish for.” During her career at the Met she also performed as Zerlina in Don Giovanni, and she had the distinction of performing at the new Met as Pamina in the memorable Marc Chagall- designed performance of The Magic Flute. In reviewing the recordings of the CDs produced for the Metropolitan Opera’s 50th year celebration of the new opera house, Dewey Faulkner wrote that hearing the broadcast of Judith Raskin’s Pamina “ makes one love her all over again.” Yale Review January 2018, vol. 106, no. 1.  Ms. Raskin appeared on the NBC television opera as the bride in Menotti’s Labyrinth (Wikipedia), an opera that was never intended to be performed on stage. Although Harold Schonberg of the Times was critical of the opera he praised the singers including John Reardon and Judith Raskin. Other roles performed at the Met included Micaela in Carmen, Nanetta in Falstaff, Marzeline in Fidelio and Sophie in Der Rosenkavalier.  Ms. Raskin performed Pamina in The Magic Flute for two summer seasons at the Glyndebourne Festival.  She also sang at the Chicago Lyric Opera, San Francisco Opera company.

In 1969, Raskin performed in Boston for the Peabody Mason Concert series.  During the rest of her career, she would specialize in lyrical roles written not only by Mozart but also by Richard Strauss. Judith Raskin was chosen by George Szell to be the “first desk soprano” of the Cleveland Orchestra; with the maestro she recorded Mahler’s Fourth Symphony, a highly rated recording that was reissued in the Great Performances series. For that album, she was nominated as The Best Classical Vocal Soloist at the 9th annual Grammy awards. With Szell she also recorded Mozart’s Exsultate Jubilate.  She was chosen by Igor Stravinsky to be the Anne Trulove on a studio recording of his opera, The Rake’s Progress, that was conducted by Stravinsky himself. Ms. Raskin’s discography is extensive. At the 7 th Grammy awards she was nominated as Most Promising New Classical Recording Artist for her recording of “Jauchzet Gott in Allen Landen.” She has recorded for Columbia, London Decca, RCA Victor and CRI recording studios. Her RCA recording of Cosi Fan Tutte won a Grammy for “ best opera recording” in 1968.

Ms. Raskin also served on many music advisory boards, as well as in the Young Concert Artists, the National Opera Institute and the National Endowment for the Arts.  One of her main concerns was the need to establish more opera companies in American cities to provide practical experience to "well trained American singers with no place to go", since "the only way to become professional is to perform." Ms. Raskin moved gracefully from the large opera stage to the intimate settings of recitals.  She was well known for her concerts in, and recordings of, Lieder.  Beginning her recital work in 1964 after receiving the Ford Foundation grant, she continued to concertize in many venues. She performed the works of contemporary composers, Miriam Gideon and Ezra Laderman at Carnegie Hall in 1977; Harold Schonberg of the Times wrote that she “did honor to the music.” She sang at the Cleveland Chamber Music Society; Robert Finn in The Plain Dealer wrote in 1967 "...when it comes to the total package of voice, musicianship, personality projection and so on, I cannot think of any recitalist who is her superior."  While her operatic singing received excellent reviews she commented to Edward Rothstein of the New York Times, “In my heart of hearts I have always been a recitalist. The recital is personal. I always liked the idea that I could say something directly. One person is all I need. An audience is multiples of one person. (NYT  May 15, 1981)

As a music educator, Raskin taught at the Manhattan School of Music, and at the 92nd Street Y, where she took the role of Pearl, the rabbi's wife, in Lazar Weiner's opera The Golem'' in 1979.

Following a 2-year battle with ovarian cancer, Raskin died in New York in 1984. Harold Schonberg in his NY Times obituary of Ms. Raskin wrote “as a leading singer with the New York City Opera, and then at the Metropolitan Opera from 1962 to 1972, Miss Raskin was hailed as one of the finest artists of her time. She had a voice that critics constantly referred to as 'ravishing.’ Combined with the beauty of her sound was a high order of musicianship. In addition, Miss Raskin was a beautiful woman and an excellent actress. As a complete artist, she captivated audiences whenever she appeared.” “Many believed her to be the most attractive Adele in Strauss' Fledermaus within memory.” (New York Times, Dec. 22, 1984)After her death the family began an annual concert at The Stephen Wise Free Synagogue at which a winner of the National Council awards would perform; the annual Judith Raskin Memorial Concert ran for 25 years.  There are currently awards established in her name for young singers at the National Council of the Metropolitan Opera, the Manhattan School of Music and Smith College.

See also
 Haydn: Die Schöpfung (Leonard Bernstein recording)

References

2 RCA Victor recorded highlights of Sigmund Romberg's 'Desert Song' with Mario Lanza and Judith Raskin; reissued on CD in January 2011

Sources

External links

Judith Raskin papers  at the Sophia Smith Collection, Smith College Special Collections

1928 births
1984 deaths
American operatic sopranos
Jewish American musicians
Jewish classical musicians
Singers from New York City
Smith College alumni
Jewish opera singers
Voice teachers
Manhattan School of Music faculty
Deaths from ovarian cancer
Deaths from cancer in New York (state)
20th-century American women opera singers
Classical musicians from New York (state)
Women music educators
American women academics
20th-century American Jews